The Spring Hill Farm is a historic slave plantation located in Ellicott City in Howard County, Maryland, United States.

The site south of the Patapsco River produced Native American arrowheads in routine farming. The farm is part of a 1695 900 acre land patent named "Chews Resolution Manor". The property was a gift of Caleb Dorsey of Belmont to his daughter Rebecca and her husband Charles Ridgely creating the parcel "Rebecca's Lot". The main house was built about 1804. The property contains the Spring Hill quarters, a stone structure dating to 1790 built originally as a home for Edward Hill Dorsey. The structure has served as slave quarters, a carriage house with modern remodeling of the interior in the 1950s.
The farm was later owned by the Clark family who also resided to the south at Fairfield Farm. Owner Garnett "Booker" Clark used the outbuildings to make and store whiskey during prohibition. Garnett's brother James "Booker" Clark maintained his credibility as a revenue officer by destroying the operation. About ten outbuildings of the farm are identified in 1790 tax rolls. By the 1970s the farm had been subdivided down to two parcels totaling 11 acres, with a large power-line easement and the New Cut Landfill facility occupying the northern tracts.

In the year 2000, Glen Mar Church purchased 21 acres of the farmland from the Baugher family with an address of 4701 New Cut Road. In 2004 groundbreaking occurred and in 2008 the church relocated to the site from Glen Mar Road.

See also
List of Howard County properties in the Maryland Historical Trust
Fairfield Farm - Adjoining farm to the south
New Cut Landfill 
Pushpin Farm - A nearby farm also owned by Col Edward Dorsey

References

Houses in Howard County, Maryland
Buildings and structures in Ellicott City, Maryland
Plantations in Maryland
Houses completed in 1790
Slave cabins and quarters in the United States